3CX is an international VoIP IPBX software developer. Its 3CX Phone System, an open-standards, software-based PBX, was initially only deployable on Windows but as of 2016 can be deployed on Linux and on cloud platforms. 3CX can be integrated with multiple CRM systems. 3CX has offices and a presence in multiple locations across the globe, including Australia, Cyprus, Dubai, France, Germany, Italy, Mexico, Netherlands, Russia, Spain, United Kingdom and United States.

History

3CX was founded by Nick Galea in 2005. 3CX's first product release was 3CX Phone System which was developed and released as a free IP PBX in 2006.

In 2007, the company released the first commercial edition of 3CX Phone System, v6.0.

In 2013, 3CX acquired eWorks technologies and launched its first video conferencing feature - an integrated and clientless, WebRTC-based video conferencing solution. This was then followed by the release of 3CX WebMeeting Server in February 2015 which was then discontinued following the release of version 15.

On September 7, 2016, it was reported by Channel Biz UK that 3CX partnered with BT Wholesale SIP Trunking platform to serve resellers.

In 2016, 3CX acquired the Elastix project and PBX in a Flash. With this acquisition the Elastix Distro versioned at 5.0 was switched to a proprietary software on top of Debian with the 3CX platform.

Thereafter in 2017, the company further developed 3CX's compatibility to extend to Linux as well. It also acquired Askozia in the same year and released the Call Flow Designer, a visual app designed to automate call flows and phone related daily work tasks.

In 2019, 3CX acquired WP Live Chat, a free WordPress plugin for Live Chat integration. It also added Facebook and SMS integrations, therefore becoming a full omnichannel solution. The same year, Stefan Walther was appointed as the new CEO of the company.

In 2021 with the launch of version 18, 3CX integrated with Microsoft Teams and allowed direct routing through the Microsoft platform.

On June 21, 2022, it was announced Walther would step down as CEO, with Galea returning to the position.

Market Segments 
 Windows Market
3CX's first market segment was the Windows market. The company's initial goal was to develop an IP PBX which was compatible with Windows and which could integrate with multiple forms of CRM software.
 Linux Market
In 2016, 3CX introduced a Linux version which runs on Debian.

 Cloud: Virtual Hosting Market
In March 2017, 3CX further expanded their Cloud offering by releasing PBX Express, a service that creates a hosted PBX in minutes using an instance on any hosted Virtual Private Server. 3 years later in 2020, 3CX launched the “Hosted by 3CX” service.

Awards 

2021: Best Software 2021 Award Awarded by SoftwareSuggest
2021: Best UC Software Company Award Awarded by digital.com
2020: Business Software of the Year Award Awarded by PC Pro
2019: Most complete UC solution Award Awarded by Winmag Pro
2018: Editors Choice Award Awarded by Technology Reseller 
2017: Brand of the Year Awarded by Trophies of Distribution 
2017: MKB Best Choice & Editors Choice Awarded by WinMag Pro
2017: Business Software of the Year Awarded by PC Pro
2015: Price/Performance Value Leadership Award, awarded by Frost & Sullivan
2015: Tech Innovator Award, awarded by CRN
2015: Most Innovative Product, awarded by the  Innovationspreis - IT
2015:  Best SME On Premise System, awarded by Comms National Awards
2014:  Best Enterprise On-Premise Solution, awarded by Comms National Award 
2012:  Best Emerging Technology Vendor awarded by CRN
2011:  Best Emerging Technology Vendor awarded by CRN

Association with sports 

On 8 July 2016, 3CX announced that it would will be sponsoring APOEL FC of Nicosia, Cyprus for a period of 3 years. Competing in the Champion's League multiple times. The sponsorship was renewed in 2019.

References 

Telecommunications companies of Cyprus
Software companies established in 2005
Software companies of Cyprus
Companies based in Nicosia
Cypriot brands